Tomol (also known as Tomon) is a village in Eshkevar Rural District, in the Central District of Ramsar County, Mazandaran Province, Iran. At the 2006 census, its population was 245, in 72 families.

References 

Populated places in Ramsar County